Events in the year 2021 in Cameroon.

Incumbents
President: Paul Biya
Prime Minister: Joseph Ngute

Events
Ongoing — COVID-19 pandemic in Cameroon
1 January – The United States Senate passes a strong resolution calling for a mediated solution to the armed conflict and independence movement of Ambazonia.
16 January–7 February — 2020 African Nations Championship, hosted by Cameroon – originally scheduled in 2020 but postponed due to the COVID-19 pandemic.
18–24 February —Football at the 2020 Summer Olympics – Women's qualification (CAF–CONMEBOL play-off), Cameroon 1 vs. Chile 2.
27 January – Fifty-three people are killed and 21 injured in a collision and fire between a bus and a truck in Santchou, West Region.
8 March – Maximilienne C. Ngo Mbe, human rights activist, is awarded the International Women of Courage Award.

Sports
March 30 – Francis Ngannou wins the UFC heavyweight title.

Culture
June 12 – Four films made in Cameroon are now available for streaming on Netflix in the United States. The Fisherman's Diary has won numerous awards and was pre-selected for the 2021 Academy Awards.

Deaths
February 3 – Norbert Owona, 70, footballer (Union Douala, national team).
February 21 – Bernard Njonga, 65, activist and politician.
February 27 – Pascal Monkam, 90, businessman.
April 2 – Christian Wiyghan Tumi, 90, Roman Catholic cardinal.
April 9
Gervais Mendo Ze, 76, linguist and academic.
Rabiatou Njoya, 75, writer and Bamun advisor.
Martin Aristide Okouda, 69, politician.
April 10
Guillaume Oyônô Mbia, 82, writer.
Victor Mukete, 102, politician and traditional chief, senator (since 1959).

See also

COVID-19 pandemic in Africa
African Continental Free Trade Area
2019 Ambazonian leadership crisis

References

External links
World Report 2021: Cameroon

 
2020s in Cameroon
Years of the 21st century in Cameroon
Cameroon
Cameroon